Clarence Pier is an amusement pier in Portsmouth, Hampshire. It is located next to Southsea Hoverport. Unlike most seaside piers in the UK, the pier does not extend very far out to sea and instead goes along the coast.

History
The pier was originally constructed and opened in 1861 by the Prince and Princess of Wales and boasted a regular ferry service to the Isle of Wight. It was damaged by air raids during World War II and was reopened in its current form on 1 June 1961 after being rebuilt by local architects A.E. Cogswell & Sons and R. Lewis Reynish.

About

The complex consists of a striking pavilion building with distinctive yellow and blue cladding and a small tower, with a fellow building next to it, where the entrance to the rides are located.

The main funfair operates on a free admission, pay-per-ride token-based system. In the early 1980s, the amusement park was named "Fun Acres" and as well as the whole pier itself, it also took up 3500 sq metres of land or so to the north-west of the northern part of the pier. This part of the park was cleared and redeveloped as another arcade called "Southsea Island Leisure", The Clarence Pier Public House, a crazy golf course and a Premier Inn during the 1990s, therefore the park itself is significantly smaller than it used to be. The old part of the park contained the 56-seat Corbiere Spherical Ferris Wheel and a ghost train among other attractions. The token booths were shaped as mushrooms.

One of the main landmarks of Clarence Pier until the mid-1990s was the Super Loop ride, since removed. The Ferris wheel was sold and relocated to Pleasureland Southport. One ride which lasted the duration was the Skyways roller coaster which was removed in 2018.

Golden Horseshoe
The main building, known as the "Golden Horseshoe", houses a fairly large amusement arcade as well as a small bowling alley. During the building's reconstruction following the original building's bombing during the war, the venue housed a Cafeteria, Ballroom and various gift shops before becoming an arcade during the 1980s.

A Coffee Cup Café opened up in 2009 in a section that formerly housed a Prize Bingo Hall.

The first floor of the building houses a Wimpy bar which is located within a door on the left of the Golden Horseshoe or within a set of stairs in the venue.

Pirates and Princesses Play Area
The right side of the Golden Horseshoe housed an indoor playground called the "Pirates and Princesses Play Area", which opened in 1985 as Pirate Pete's, and closed at the beginning of January 2023 after 37 years of service. It is currently unknown what is replacing the play area.

The "Clarence Pier"
A smaller building, perpendicular but not physically joined to the main pavilion houses another amusement arcade, named the "Clarence Pier", which was constructed in 1958 to replace an earlier public house of the same name that was bombed during World War II. The Arcade located on the ground floor was known as the "Wheel Of Fortune" for many years until being renamed to its current name in 2012. Next to the venue are some small gift shops.

The Whitbread-operated public house was renamed "Seahorse Bars" in 1964, and then "Barnum's" in 1990 before being destroyed in a fire in 1993. During the building's refurbishment, the former pub was converted into 'Jurassic 3001', a futuristic dinosaur-themed dark ride, which opened in 1995. The ride's exterior featured an animatronic triceratops, whose head protruded from the side of the building and roared occasionally at passers-by. The attraction closed in 2001, yet all ride signage and theming on the building remained until the end of 2011. The upper floor space previously occupied by this ride underwent a conversion to apartments, according to planning publications, in 2012.

Other Venues
A building at the side of the funfair houses an arcade called "Games Wharf" and "The Boat House" (originally another Coffee Cup).

Another newer addition to the pier is a pirate-themed crazy golf course situated behind the Clarence Pier arcade.

In Pop-culture

"Mind the Baby, Mr. Bean", an episode of British TV comedy series "Mr. Bean" was filmed on location at Clarence Pier (as well as other locations in Southsea) and aired on ITV in 1994. This was prior to the closure of the north-western part of the park and the closure of the Wheel Of Fortune public house. The episode shows the Super Loop, Skyways roller coaster, and many of the park's other attractions from that time. Clarence Pier was also the filming location to the teen pop band, "S Club Juniors" song, "Fool No More" filmed mainly on the dodgems but the rollercoaster, 'Skyways' can also be seen in the video.

Attractions

Key
 Roller Coasters
 Water Rides
 Dark Rides

Operating

Other

Former Attractions

Ferris wheel proposals 
The Solent Eye Ferris wheel was proposed by Billy Manning Ltd for Clarence Pier in 2007. On 17 October, permission for a  wheel was granted, but two days later it was revealed that Portsmouth City Councillors wished the wheel was bigger. As a result, the original plans, which were for a  wheel, were revived and conditional planning permission subsequently granted on 19 December 2007. It was expected to cost £2 million. The plans were scrapped because the wheel was too large.

In 2015, a revived plan for a 110 ft wheel was sent. It was approved and opened in Easter 2016. Despite the popularity of the wheel, it was confirmed in September 2016 that the Solent Wheel will be taken down and sent elsewhere, which was later revealed to be Ireland. In March 2017, Clarence Pier's website was updated to say that the wheel would return in 2018, which it did. The wheel returned for the 2019 and 2020 seasons, until it was confirmed on August 27, 2020 that the wheel will not return for the 2021 season, and was closed for the final time on the 27th of September.

References

External links

 

Piers in Hampshire
Buildings and structures in Hampshire
Tourist attractions in Hampshire
Amusement parks in England
Burned buildings and structures in the United Kingdom
Pier fires